Making Plans is the eighth studio album by country music artist Ricky Van Shelton.  This album was released exclusively through Wal-Mart, so it was unable to chart and no singles were released.  This was Van Shelton's only release under the Vanguard label.

Track listing
”Just Say Goodbye” (Joe Chambers, Byron Hill) – 2:11
”When the Feeling Goes Away” (Merle Haggard) – 2:59
”She Needs Me” (Chuck Cannon, Jimmy Stewart) – 3:15
”Borrowed Angel” (Mel Street) – 3:11
”I Wish You Were More Like Your Memory” (Joe Chambers) – 3:00
”Tic Toc” (Brett Beavers, Troy Johnson) – 2:53
”It Wouldn't Kill Me” (Larry Boone, Paul Nelson, Tom Shapiro) – 3:05
”Making Plans” (Voni Morrison, Johnny Russell) – 2:14
”He's Not the Man I Used to Be” (Gary Duffey, Micki Foster) – 3:35
“Our Love” (Deana Cox, Mike Geiger, Woody Mullis) – 2:59
”The Best Thing Goin'” (Geiger, Michael Huffman, Mullis) – 3:16
”The Best Is Yet to Come” (Colleen Peterson, Cyril Lawson, Nancy Simmonds) – 3:06

Personnel
 Victor Battista - upright bass
 Eddie Bayers - drums
 Paul Franklin - steel guitar
 Sonny Garrish - steel guitar
 Steve Gibson - electric guitar, mandolin
 Roy Huskey Jr. - upright bass
 Liana Manis - background vocals
 Tom Robb - bass guitar
 Hargus "Pig" Robbins - piano, Wurlitzer
 Matt Rollings - Hammond organ, piano, Wurlitzer
 John Wesley Ryles - background vocals
 Ricky Van Shelton - lead vocals
 Joe Spivey - fiddle
 Bruce Watkins - acoustic guitar
 Dennis Wilson - background vocals

References

1998 albums
Ricky Van Shelton albums
Vanguard Records albums
Albums produced by Steve Buckingham (record producer)